Montecastello is a comune (municipality) in the Province of Alessandria in the Italian region Piedmont, located about  east of Turin and about  northeast of Alessandria.

Montecastello borders the following municipalities: Alessandria, Bassignana, Pecetto di Valenza, Pietra Marazzi, Piovera, and Rivarone.

References

Cities and towns in Piedmont